Cheap Shots, Youth Anthems is an album released in 2003 by American punk rock band Kid Dynamite on Jade Tree. The album consists of covers, demos, live tracks and songs previously released on other albums. The cover is a tribute to The Who's album Odds & Sods.

Track list

References

Kid Dynamite (band) albums
Jade Tree (record label) albums
2003 compilation albums